The 1991 Grambling State Tigers football team represented Grambling State University as a member of the Southwestern Athletic Conference (SWAC) during the 1991 NCAA Division I-AA football season. Led by 49th-year head coach Eddie Robinson, the Tigers compiled an overall record of 5–6 and a mark of 3–4 in conference play, and finished tied for sixth in the SWAC.

Schedule

References

Grambling State
Grambling State Tigers football seasons
Grambling State Tigers football